Pierre Perroy (11 February 1907 - 19 September 1990) was a French politician. 
Perroy was born in Fleury-les-Aubrais.  He represented the National Centre of Independents and Peasants (CNIP) in the National Assembly from 1956 to 1958.

References
 http://www.assemblee-nationale.fr/sycomore/

1907 births
1990 deaths
People from Loiret
Politicians from Centre-Val de Loire
National Centre of Independents and Peasants politicians
Deputies of the 3rd National Assembly of the French Fourth Republic
HEC Paris alumni
French military personnel of World War II